Superbia is an unproduced musical with book, music, and lyrics by Jonathan Larson. Stemming from an earlier attempt at writing a musical based on Nineteen Eighty-Four by George Orwell, Larson spent a six-year period from 1985 to 1991 working on Superbia, which for numerous reasons never went beyond the workshop stage of development. Eventually, Larson set aside Superbia for other projects, including Rent, and passed away in 1996 before he could return to working on it.

Superbia was a science fiction musical set in the year 2064 in a world dominated by TVs and cameras. The overall message Larson pursued, which remained to his final draft, was a cautionary tale about media desensitization. He described it as a futuristic fairy tale along the lines of Cinderella and The Emperor's New Clothes. Larson wanted to blend the inherent theatricality of 1980s pop with musical theater storytelling. To that end, he composed the musical largely on a synthesizer, combining New Wave synth-pop and rock with traditional Broadway and vaudevillian structures. Superbia thus represents Larson's first serious attempt to meld popular music styles with musical theater, a combination he later became well-known for with Rent.

Superbia has never been produced or published even after Larson's death, but interest in it has persisted due to its depiction in his semi-autobiographical musical Tick, Tick... Boom! and its 2021 film adaptation.

Background
Superbia takes place in 2064 in a world run by the Prods, who design Shapes (useless hunks of plastics) and write programs for the Ins. The Ins' lives are broadcast on a never-ending stream of reality TV and infomercials from Incity, a massive satellite in orbit around Earth (a giant suburb called Outland). The Outland is inhabited by Outs: they consume the Shapes, which are designed to break, thus ensuring a stable economy. Out lives and purchasing habits are controlled by the Media Transmitter (MT), an endless stream of television that also broadcasts the reality TV featuring the Ins. Tick, Tick... Boom! director Lin-Manuel Miranda later quipped that Larson predicted both social media and planned obsolescence. The world of Superbia is controlled by the evil Master Babble Articulator (MBA), and all emotions are suppressed in favor of the television broadcasts, with members of society programmed for their specific path in life. The main character is "Josh Out #177583962," who unlike the rest of the world has true emotions, making him an outcast.

Synopsis 

Larson developed Superbia over the course of several years, overhauling the script with his continued failed efforts to get it produced. As a result, there are seven drafts of Superbia, each with different songs, plot elements, and even characters. The Library of Congress catalogs these drafts between two tonally distinct versions: "Superbia v1", which constitutes the story from its inception to around September 1987, and "Superbia v2", the story for the rest of its development, the synopses of which are described here.

Superbia v1 (1985-September 1987) plot summary

Act 1 
In the year 2064 at the Incity control room, the Master Babble Articulator teaches its Clone to speak. The MBA teaches it about the rules of the world ("Tapecopy #001 (Superbia)"). In Outland, Josh spends his time experimenting with broken Shapes, with mixed results ("Too Cold To Care"). To his surprise, a part of his invention – an old music box – falls to the ground and opens, playing a nostalgic tune. Josh tries to show the box to his family but is ignored, so he leaves home. Meanwhile, Mr. and Mrs. Prod #27 vacation in the Outland's Badlands (a nature reserve) with their daughter, Elizabeth In #319. They are distressed that she is reading a book of old musical theater lyrics, as reading has been outlawed, and tell her she is programmed to fall in love with celebrity Studd Starr. Elizabeth flees and turns to her book for guidance as her parents spy on her. ("Eye On Her/Mr. Hammerstein II").

A distraught Elizabeth meets Josh in the woods, and they bond when Josh reveals his knowledge of her songbook, offering to cheer up with the music box ("Turn the Key"). The music box seems to deviate Elizabeth from her programming, and she offers to put Josh on the Incity guest list so he can unleash the music box on all of Superbia via the MT. Hearing this, Elizabeth's parents arrange for an agent to kill Josh on the Incity shuttle. In-flight, Josh and Elizabeth imagine a happy ending to come ("Ever After"), but are separated by Mrs. Prod. Josh reflects on where he stands with Elizabeth ("She Hates Me") and is held up by Hank In #1313, an ex-celebrity who has been promised a comeback in return for killing Josh. Mr. and Mrs. Prod tell Elizabeth the box doesn't actually work, and that she has always had emotions. Josh is initially refused entry into Incity, but is escorted in by the mysterious Roi, who seemingly mistakes him for Hank ("Face Value"). Back in the Control Room, the MBA plays for the Clone a video of Incity's first broadcast, a "We Are the World"-esque pop song called "Let's All Sing".

Act 2 
Josh and Roi arrive in Incity, and Roi gets Josh high on electricity ("Incity"). They run into Elizabeth, who claims not to know Josh and leaves with Studd. The real Hank is chased by security, but Josh refuses to help him. Roi takes Josh back to her apartment: unaware that they are being broadcast for all to see, including his family in Outland, Josh has sex with Roi ("Doin' It On The Air"). Mr. Prod asks the MBA to intervene, only to learn Roi is a spy. The next morning, an announcement on the MT reveals Josh and Studd are nominated for Face Awards, while Hank remains on the run. Roi takes away the music box and keeps Josh high on the power line. While Studd does his makeup, Elizabeth sends Josh a note to warn him about Roi and remind him of their plans to put the music box on the air. Hank swears revenge on Josh and the Ins ("Sextet").

At the Face Awards, Josh and Roi are joined by Studd, Elizabeth, and Studd's agent Tim Pursent ("A Tribute to Plastic Surgery"). Tim offers to make Josh a Prod, and Roi intercepts Elizabeth's note. A presentation by actor William Marcel goes awry when Marcel speaks out against the MBA and is beaten for deviating. Josh wins Face of the Year, now completely converted into an In. However, Hank enters, denounces him, and blows a hole in the satellite's hole, sending the Ins into chaos as there is only 15 minutes of air remaining ("Limelight").

Elizabeth convinces Josh he is the only one who can save the Ins ("Come to Your Senses"). The MBA declares to its Clone that humanity is no longer cost-effective and so plans to destroy Outland with nuclear weapons and let Incity's inhabitants die in the vacuum of space. Josh and Elizabeth arrive and destroy the MBA and the Clone with the powers of song and emotion. Josh impersonates the MBA by ordering the Ins to evacuate, and as he affirms his love for Elizabeth they open the music box and leave it running for the cameras.

Superbia v2 (September 1987–1989) plot summary 
The biggest change Larson made was that the MBA plans to exterminate all of the Ins and Outs from the beginning in a process called "delimbination", and turn to exploring the galaxy with his Clones. Superbians are now assigned a "role" by the MBA and programmed at birth, a process Larson dubbed "contentrification" in this draft. The tone of this version is much darker and more pessimistic. Larson historian J. Collis speculates that the darker tone reflects the composer's growing frustrations about his career: producers were still not touching Superbia despite all the work Larson put into it, and his friends like his childhood friend Matt O'Grady were getting steady jobs in their fields while he was still an impoverished composer.

Act 1 
The theater's curtains pull away to reveal a glossy stage and projections of stars and planets on a rear scrim ("Fanfare for the Bottom Line").

In the Outland, Josh's family watch the MT with Josh's MBA-assigned mate Elizabeth. A special announcement plays from rock star Mick Knife, who declares to the people of Earth that everything is fine, war is over, and the only thing people need to do is plug into their power sockets or grab the wires in their MTs and get high ("Let's All Sing").  As Josh enters from exploring a forbidden zone, the MT announces humanity will enter its next stage where the Ins and Outs are "The Victims." Recognizing what is planned, Josh decides to spend his last 35 hours partying in Incity ("Too Cold To Care"). Elizabeth chases him down but he rejects her, giving her a rose and a passionate kiss as a parting gift.

On the Incity shuttle, Josh meets Studd Starr and his droid Chip, who tells Josh how to sneak past Incity's bouncer. Elizabeth has an emotional awakening and decides to follow Josh ("Uncomfortable"). Studd tells of Josh's arrival to the MBA, who is preparing an advert about humanity's upcoming "Delimbination". Chip's advice turns out to be false, but Josh is led in by a mysterious In named Roi ("Face Value"). As Elizabeth leaves Outland, she is torn between her life of safety and the world of emotions she had overlooked in favor of the MT ("Pale Blue Square").

Roi gets Josh to plug in as they arrive ("Incity"), and they run into Studd and Chip. Elizabeth enters, but Josh brushes her off as Roi drags him away, leaving Elizabeth with Studd. In Outland, Josh's family watches as Josh and Roi having sex is broadcast on the MT ("Doin' it on the Air"). Josh feels guilty over his actions the next morning, choosing to plug in to numb himself ("LCD Readout"). The MT announces Josh and Roi's love scene has earned him a Face Award nominated. Studd has also been nominated, but is unable to celebrate as Elizabeth has locked herself in the bathroom after refusing to join a threesome with him and Chip. Elizabeth writes Josh a note telling him to forget the previous night and try again. The MBA decides that Josh would make an ideal spokesman and first victim for the Delimbination. The MT announces the full list of nominees as everyone looks forward to the awards ("Sextet").

Act 2 
After a massive production number ("A Tribute to Plastic Surgery") the awards begin. The nominees are joined by Studd's agent Tim Pursent. Elizabeth's note is intercepted by Roi, who prevents Josh from reading it by plugging him in. Mick Knife comes out to give a speech, but proceeds to decry the world he has created and is booed off. Josh wins the awards, completely turning him into an In. Elizabeth tries to get through to him, only for Roi to send her to the Outer Obscurity prison satellite ("Limelight").

On Outer Obscurity, Elizabeth has a nightmare while watching the MBA's Delimbination announcement ("Elizabeth's Nightmare"). The MBA declares that humanity is no longer cost-effective, so all people will have their limbs and torsos removed before being hooked up to life support, staring forever at their screens. Elizabeth wakes up from her nightmare and smashes her cell's MT.

In Incity, Josh's rising star is cut off when Studd denounces him on air ("Gettim' While He's Hot"). Josh is sent to Outer Obscurity as Studd takes his place as Face of the Year and the Delimbination spokesman, while Josh's family are disappointed they won't also get to "do it on the air" ("Doin' it On the Air (Reprise)"). At Outer Obscurity, Mick Knife brings Josh to Elizabeth's cell. Elizabeth claims her undying love to the broken MT ("I Won't Close My Eyes") and accidentally electrocutes herself when she attempts to grab onto the exposed wires. Josh's emotions are restored from the tragedy as he reads her note. He repeats "Love Has No Bottom Line" as Delimbination begins. A June 1988 draft of v2 includes an ending where Josh returns to Incity to confront the MBA but is unable to save humanity.

Musical Numbers

Superbia v1

 Act 1
 "Tapecopy #001 (Superbia)" - MBA
 "Too Cold To Care" - Josh
 "Eye On Her/Mr. Hammerstein II" - Mr. and Mrs Prod, Elizabeth
 "Turn the Key" - Josh and Elizabeth
 "Ever After" - Josh and Elizabeth
 "She Hates Me" - Josh
 "Face Value" - Josh and Roi
 "Let's All Sing" - Company

 Act 2
 "Incity" - Company
 "Doin' it on the Air" - Josh's Family
 "Sextet" - Company
 "A Tribute to Plastic Surgery" - Company
 "Limelight" - Hank
 "Come To Your Senses" - Elizabeth

Superbia v2

 Act 1
 "Fanfare for the Bottom Line" - Prologue
 "Let's All Sing" - Mick Knife and Company
 "Too Cold To Care" - Josh
 "Uncomfortable" - Elizabeth
 "Delimbination" - Company
 "Face Value" - Bouncer, A Man, Josh, Roi, Company
 "Pale Blue Square" - Elizabeth
 "Incity" -  Roi and Company
 "Doin' It On the Air" - Mop, Pop and Jennifer
 "LCD Readout" - Josh
 "Sextet" - M.T., Roi, Josh, Elizabeth, Studd, M.B.A.

 Act 2
 "A Tribute to Plastic Surgery" - The Company
 "Limelight" - Josh
 "Elizabeth's Nightmare" - Company (Ballet)
 "Gettim' While He's Hot" - Tim Pursent, Studd, and Prods
 "Doin' It On the Air (Reprise)" - Mop, Pop, and Jennifer
 "I Won't Close My Eyes" - Elizabeth
 "Love Has No Bottom Line" - Josh

Additional Numbers
 "Introduction to Superbia" - A version of the opening number, performed by the company.
 "After the Revolution" - This song was written for 1984 and recycled in some earlier versions of Superbia before eventually becoming "Ever After". It was also performed by Larson, Scott Burkell, and Marin Mazzie in their cabaret act J. Glitz.
 "One of These Days" - This was Josh's "I Want" song in earlier versions of Superbia, later replaced by "Too Cold To Care." "One of These Days" is one of the few Superbia tracks that has since been publicly released.
 "SOS" - This was the original finale of 1984, sung by Winston Smith. "SOS" stands out among the 1984 tracks due to more clearly demonstrating Larson's pop-rock influence.
 "Where I Come From" - A duet between Josh and Elizabeth. It is unclear if this is an earlier title for "Turn the Key" or an entirely different song.
 "The Meaningless Game" - A ballet sequence.
 "The Electric Gate" - A song sung by Hank at the gates of Incity.
 "Today" - An earlier take on "Sextet", if not the same song with just a different title.
 "Acceptance" - A song performed by Josh, implied to be an earlier version of "Limelight."
 "Superbia (Reprise)" -  A song performed by the company.
 "Finale" - Performed by Josh, Company, and the MBA.
 "Tapecopy #002" - The subject of this song is unknown, but in one draft it would have been placed after "Turn the Key". Its title suggests it is a follow-up to "Tapecopy #001 (Superbia)" and thus is sung by the MBA.
 "Greenslime" - The subject of this song is unknown, but it was placed in one draft between "Too Cold To Care" and "Eye On Her/Mr. Hammerstein II".

Production

Early development (1982-1985)

Superbia began as an attempt by Larson to create a musical adaptation of the George Orwell novel Nineteen Eighty-Four. He began writing it shortly after graduating from Adelphi University in 1982, recording a demo of the score by 1983 and hoping to have it open on Broadway by the year 1984 itself.

With 1984, Larson condensed Orwell's novel into 60 pages across two acts, while his demo tape ran 45 minutes. The script focused on key scenes of Winston Smith meeting Julia and his torture in Room 101, with visuals used to flesh out details. Larson went so far as to sketch out basic stage design, including the idea of a two-way Telescreen framing the proscenium. Some songs from 1984 eventually found their way into Superbia, such as a song called "After the Revolution" which was rewritten into "Ever After."

However, Larson was unable to secure the rights to Nineteen Eighty-Four due to the upcoming film adaptation. Though disappointed at the time, he would later reflect that it was probably for the best: with the exception of a few songs, the score was more traditional musical theater than the pop-rock sound he was looking for, and his lack of experience showed in songs laden with repetitive music and exposition. He also realized the traditional method of recording demos with just piano and vocals would not work for the level of complexity he was trying to achieve, which would be reflected in his later attempts to create more complex demos for all of his musicals. Nevertheless, he felt it was an important step in his career because it was his first serious attempt at writing a full-length musical.

1984 becomes Superbia
Larson still wanted to create a dystopian science fiction musical using his intended cross-genre musical style. Taking the advice of one of his professors, he kept the material from this failed musical adaptation, eventually coming up with his own world during a visit to the nightclub Area in late 1984: Larson pictured the venue as though it were a massive space satellite where "the coolest of the cool" were sheltered from the grit of the outside world. Larson began writing the new show, Superbia, in earnest in 1985. Using what he learned from 1984, Larson's demos reflect an effort to more clearly demonstrate what he wanted the songs to sound like. He began composing on a 50 key Casio keyboard, and by 1987 he was composing on a full Yamaha DX7. Many of his custom synth patches were designed by friend Steve Skinner, who would later arrange the orchestrations for Rent. Where possible, Larson would record demos in a rented studio space, using his digital arrangements to create a more advanced sound. Several of Larson's friends contributed vocals to these demos, including future Broadway stars Marin Mazzie and Roger Bart.

The Superbia workshops (1985-1991)

Songs from Superbia were first presented at the ASCAP Musical Theatre Workshop from November to December 1985, beginning the six-year workshop development of the musical. During this process, Larson received feedback from panels of various musical theater composers and writers, including his idol and eventual mentor Stephen Sondheim. Sondheim and some of his fellow panelists were complimentary of Larson's ambitions and desire to write in a new style, but others criticized the script's internal rules, complexity, and apparent weakness of its message. Larson presented more material at the Dramatists Guild in April 1986, where once again Sondheim was one of the few who praised the piece, although he noted the musical as written was too traditionally structured for what Larson was trying to do. Larson verbally sparred with 1776 book writer and Dramatists Guild president Peter Stone during the presentation. Not only did Stone dislike the musical, he vocally disagreed with the political message Larson was trying to tell, claiming that the idea of media making people emotionally disconnected was ridiculous. Larson's attempts to push back were met by Stone angrily talking over both him and a member of the audience who came to Larson's defense. This argument between two different generations of musical theater writers proved prophetic for the kind of rejections Larson would receive.

Following the musical theater workshop presentations, Larson began putting on both private readings of the full musical, as well as public readings at Naked Angels and The Public Theater in 1987. With Sondheim's help, Larson won the Richard Rodgers Development Grant for Superbia at the end of 1987, and used the money to fund a reading in December 1988 at Playwrights Horizons, produced by Ira Weitzman and directed by R. J. Cutler. The reading ended up being a disappointment for Larson, largely because he was unable to get a full rock band for his score, and was only allowed to have union performers, not the non-union actors whom he had written the show for. As a result, Larson's attempt at blending genres was lost in the single piano accompaniment, and the actors who were trained in more traditional musical theater were unable to perform the pop-rock vocals that the piece required. Sondheim, who had come to support his pupil, left after the first act. As a direct response to this failed workshop, Larson's friend Victoria Leacock helped Larson produce a concert version of Superbia at the Village Gate on September 11, 1989. Unlike the Playwrights Horizon workshop, this concert used a live band and the non-union actors Larson had wanted in his cast, including Bart and Timothy Britten Parker. The concert was one of only two times Superbia was performed with a full band.

Larson had an opportunity to develop and possibly stage Superbia in the United Kingdom when it was shortlisted for the Buxton Opera House's "Quest for New Musicals" competition. However he was unhappy with the contract for further consideration, which would have only guaranteed a workshop and limited his ability to pitch the show in New York. Ultimately, he turned it down for the chance to do a second reading of Superbia at The Public Theater in December 1991. J. Collis, author of the Larson oral history Boho Days: The Wider Works of Jonathan Larson, described not developing Superbia in the UK as "the biggest mistake Larson could have made." The second Public Theater reading ultimately did not go well: the reading was scheduled on the same day as the theater's Christmas party, which started right at intermission for Superbia. Larson's friend Paul Scott Goodman, who played the character Mick Knife in the reading, recalled that 25 people were in the audience for the start of the show, and at most 10 were back after intermission. This was the final major presentation of Superbia's material in Larson's lifetime.

Development stalls
Even after multiple workshops, Superbia was not ready for a full production. Larson was still unable to solve the story problems, and the show's content was too risky for Broadway producers and too technologically prohibitive for Off-Broadway theaters. Retrospective evaluations of the musical note even Broadway theaters at the time would have been unable to handle the rock-concert style sound design needed for Superbia. Larson himself was aware his style of music was largely beyond what contemporary theatrical sound designers were trained for, commenting on the eve of his death in 1996 that "I'm only as good as my soundboard operator."

Larson vented his frustrations over his stalled career in 1989 by writing a rock monologue titled 30/90, which depicted the aftermath of the failed Playwrights Horizons workshop. This was revised into Boho Days, eventually becoming his musical Tick, Tick... Boom! which he performed at his later artistic home of New York Theatre Workshop in 1992 and 1993. Though Sondheim was complimentary of Boho Days, he warned Larson to move on from Superbia, feeling his continued attachment to the piece was hindering Larson's career.

Although Larson tried adapting the Superbia script into a screenplay in 1990 or 1991, this was just a writing exercise and ultimately went nowhere. Eventually, he chose to focus on Rent, which he spent the remainder of his life developing. He passed away from a sudden aortic aneurysm the night before Rent's first Off-Broadway preview in 1996, having never seen a full production of Superbia.

Fate of the material
Larson's scripts, sheet music, and demos for Superbia and 1984 are kept in the Jonathan Larson Papers at the Library of Congress. A recording of the Village Gate performance, filmed by Victoria Leacock Hoffman, is in her private possession.

Although Superbia itself was ultimately never produced, several songs from it have since been released through other means. When Tick, Tick... Boom! was adapted into a three-person musical in 2001, playwright David Auburn restructured the show to center it around the buildup to, the performance, and aftermath of the Playwrights Horizons Superbia workshop. This provided an opportunity to include "Come to Your Senses", which thematically fit with the new story. Larson's demos for "LCD Readout" and "One of These Days" were included on the 2007 album Jonathan Sings Larson. "One of These Days" and a song from 1984, "SOS", were included on The Jonathan Larson Project album released in 2019.

When Tick, Tick... Boom! was adapted into the 2021 film, director Lin-Manuel Miranda and screenwriter Steven Levenson made an active effort to feature more of the Superbia songs. In addition to “Come to Your Senses”, two songs from Superbia are prominently featured in the movie: the previously-released "LCD Readout", and the song "Sextet", as the lyrics thematically fit with the story of the film. "Ever After" is also used in the film's score.

Potential revival
An attempt was made in the mid-2000s to adapt Superbia into an animated film, but the project was cancelled during pre-production and never had a finished screenplay.

The depiction of the Superbia workshop in the 2021 film version of Tick, Tick... Boom! sparked renewed interest in Larson's unproduced musical. "Sextet", which had not been included on the film's soundtrack, was released as a single on the occasion of what would have been Larson's 62nd birthday on February 4, 2022 after considerable fan demand following its use in the film. This in turn has sparked interest in Superbia receiving a full production or some form of release of the existing material. J. Collis highlights Larson's satire of his own era predicted the rise of reality television and social media, which would make it a strong contender for a potential revival, especially as technology has reached the point that Larson's score and design vision could more easily be achieved. However, while Collis believes that such a revival is possible, both he and Tick, Tick... Boom! director Miranda agree it would be very difficult to make, due to the musical's inherent complexity, its multiple drafts, and its unfinished state.

References 

Rock musicals
Science fiction musicals